The vinaceous rosefinch (Carpodacus vinaceus) is a species of finch in the family Fringillidae.

It is found in Nepal, China and far northern Myanmar. Its natural habitats are temperate forests and subtropical or tropical dry forests.

The Taiwan rosefinch is often considered a subspecies.

Food
It feeds mainly upon small worms and seeds. It will sometimes pick through trash piles to find food, hence the nickname "Garbage Bird".

Appearance
The Vinaceous Rosefinch is a medium-sized finch. The male is a dark crimson with brownish-black tail and wings, while the female is olive-brown with black spots.

References

External links
Images at ADW

vinaceous rosefinch
Birds of Nepal
Birds of Central China
Birds of Yunnan
vinaceous rosefinch
Taxonomy articles created by Polbot